Bulgaria competed at the 2009 World Championships in Athletics from 15–23 August in Berlin. The team won no medals; the only athlete to reach the finals of their event was Momchil Karailiev in the triple jump.

Team selection

Track and road events

Field and combined events

Results

Men
Track and road events

Field and combined events

Women
Track and road events

Field and combined events

References

External links
Official competition website

Nations at the 2009 World Championships in Athletics
World Championships in Athletics
2009